Bullimore is a surname. Notable people with the surname include:

Tony Bullimore (1939–2018), English sailor and businessman
Wayne Bullimore (born 1970), English footballer